Mitchell Kawasaki (born 4 March 1950) is a Canadian wrestler and judoka. He competed in the men's Greco-Roman 48 kg at the 1976 Summer Olympics, and represented Canada at the World Judo Championships in 1971 and 1973. He is currently the chief instructor of Kawasaki Rendokan Judo Academy in Hamilton, Ontario, founded by his father Masao Kawasaki in 1958, and has held numerous positions in Judo Ontario and Judo Canada.

See also
Judo in Ontario
Judo in Canada
List of Canadian judoka
Wrestling in Canada

References

External links
 

1950 births
Living people
Canadian male sport wrestlers
Olympic wrestlers of Canada
Wrestlers at the 1976 Summer Olympics
Sportspeople from Hamilton, Ontario
Commonwealth Games medallists in wrestling
Commonwealth Games gold medallists for Canada
Wrestlers at the 1974 British Commonwealth Games
Medallists at the 1974 British Commonwealth Games